HBO Films (formerly called HBO Premiere Films and HBO Pictures) is an American production and distribution company, a division of the cable television network HBO that produces feature films and miniseries. The division produces fiction and non-fiction works, primarily for distribution to their own customers, though recently the company has been funding theatrical releases.

HBO Films slates three or four films per year and develops most them internally with theatrical films being distributed by Warner Bros. Pictures.

Background
After or around 1978, HBO was involved into preproduction financing films for exclusive pay-TV rights, which is risky as the films could be unpopular while alienated movie studios. The original Silver Screen Partners, L.P. was organized by Roland W. Betts, New York film investment broker to fund movies for HBO in 1982. The limited partnership sold through EF Hutton were oversubscribed and raised $83 million. HBO made a 50% guarantee on their investment for exclusive cable rights. HBO then joined with Columbia Pictures and CBS to form  TriStar Pictures, which was expected to become a major film studio, in 1983. HBO sold half of its ownership in TriStar in 1986.

History
HBO Premiere Films began in 1983 as a telefilm and miniseries production company with an "ambitious production schedule" for the HBO channel. With the high expense of theatrical film exclusive, those films appeared on multiple pay TV channels. Thus, the unit was started to give the channel some exclusives. The company's first head, Jane Deknatel (an English-born television veteran), projected the unit would do 24 projects in 1984 and 50 a few years later. HBO Premiere Films was funding the productions at 60% for just the pay TV rights. Their first film, The Terry Fox Story, shown in May 1983 was also the first feature film produced expressly for pay television. Two more films were produced and shown in 1983.

By the end of the first year the schedule was cut back and the unit moved into producing theatrical films. In January 1984, Donald March took over the company from Deknatel as senior vice president. He canceled a dozen projects in development and was reassessing star vehicle productions as being done as vanity projects. A production for each month from July to November was the new plan with a push for additional rights beyond pay TV rights, like foreign theatrical, home video and network television. In January 1984, a telefilm and HBO Premiere Films' first two mini-series, All the Rivers Run then Far Pavilions were cablecast. HBO Pictures started winning Emmy Awards in 1993 with two for Barbarians at the Gate and Stalin.

Around November 1996, John Matoian was appointed as president of HBO Pictures reporting to HBO chairman and CEO Jeff Bewkes. Bewkes decided by April 1999 that he want a single original programming division. Programming president Chris Albrecht oversaw original series development, specials and miniseries and was selected over Matoian. Matoian resigned because he lost his direct reporting status and would have reported to Albrecht. Executive vice president of HBO NYC Colin Callender, who reported to Matoian, was promoted to take over as president of HBO Pictures.

HBO Films
In October 1999, HBO NYC Productions was merged into HBO Pictures and renamed HBO Films under division president Callender. HBO Films Development Unit was also formed by November 1999.
 
Prior to July 2003, HBO Films made individual distribution deal for their films. The company formed its theatrical distribution division, HBO Films Domestic Theatrical Releasing, that month with a distribution label partnership pact with Fine Line Features and the hiring of Dennis O’Connor, United Artists marketing vice-president, as division head. The pact negotiation was started due a single distribution film deal between Fine Line and HBO Films for American Splendor. HBO Films Domestic Theatrical Releasing's first release was Elephant on October 24, 2003. In 2005, HBO Films Domestic Theatrical Releasing and Fine Line were effectively merged with Warner Bros. (WB) decided HBO and New Line Cinema should form a new smaller and niche films distribution arm, Picturehouse.

Len Amato, producer and as the president of Spring Creek Productions, was appointed HBO Films senior vice president in March 2007. In 2008, Picturehouse was discontinued with distribution being handled by WB's main distribution arm. HBO Films exited the theatrical film market with Picturehouse's closure. With Callender leaving to form his own production company in late 2008, no division president is appointed with department heads becoming president of their departments, Kary Antholis at HBO Miniseries, and Amato at HBO Films. Both answered to president of programming group/West Coast operations, Michael Lombardo.

Film library

Top audiences

Reception
The films produced by the company have garnered hundreds of Primetime Emmy Awards, 694 nominations with 162 wins, and Golden Globe Awards. HBO Films productions have won the Primetime Emmy Award for Outstanding Television Movie every year from 1993 to 2015, except for four years. Elephant is the first film produced by HBO Films to win the Palme d'Or at the Cannes Film Festival.

Life According to Sam is a 2013 documentary film produced by HBO Films and based on the life of Sam Berns and has been shown at film festivals, including Sundance, and it was broadcast on HBO in October. The Academy of Motion Picture Arts and Sciences said it was among 15 documentaries considered for Oscar nominations.

HBO NYC Productions
HBO Showcase was started as a second film banner for HBO in 1986 to expand the boundary of drama. Age Old Friends (1989) was the unit's first production to earn an Emmy Award. In 1996, HBO Showcase was expanded and given a new name HBO NYC Productions.

In April 1999, Colin Callender, executive VP of HBO NYC, was promoted to be HBO Pictures president. In October 1999, HBO NYC Productions was merged into HBO Pictures and renamed HBO Films under division president Callender.

In 2002, Keri Putnam was named the Executive Vice President of Movies and Mini-series at HBO Films before moving to Miramax Films in 2006.

References

External links
 

Films
HBO Films
Film production companies of the United States
Entertainment companies established in 1983
Mass media companies established in 1983
American companies established in 1983